, literally meaning Siren and stylized as PSYЯEN, is a Japanese manga series written and illustrated by Toshiaki Iwashiro. The manga was serialized in Shueisha's shōnen manga magazine Weekly Shōnen Jump from December 2007 to November 2010, with its chapters collected in sixteen tankōbon volumes. Psyren follows Ageha Yoshina, a high school student who is chosen by Nemesis Q as a participant in the Psyren games. The games take place in a world known as Psyren. In North America, Viz Media licensed the series for English release and serialized its chapters in Shonen Jump.

Plot
After Ageha Yoshina beats up a bully for 10,000 yen, he heads home anticipating a scolding from his sister for breaking curfew. On his way there, a nearby pay phone starts ringing, and he picks it up only to hear his own echo. Shrugging it off, he places the receiver back only to find a mysterious calling card with the word "Psyren" written on it. Curious about the sudden appearance of the card, he goes to his school's Occult Club and asks about it. It turns about Psyren was an urban myth, and whoever found out what it really was would get a reward of 500 million yen. The same day, he finds his classmate's (Sakurako Amamiya's) wallet, which some other girls hid, and notices she has the same card. After he returns it to her, she runs off and disappears. The last thing he hears is "Save me". The next day she isn't at school and soon she is declared missing. Ageha calls the number on the card in hopes of finding her. After answering a long and detailed quiz on a pay phone, he is asked if he wants to go to Psyren. The next day, while he is being chased by two mysterious people pretending to be police officers; his phone rings. In a panic, he picks up and is suddenly drawn into the world of Psyren, which is a wasteland inhabited by monsters called Taboo. It is later revealed that the Taboo were once humans that were turned into Taboo by an organization known as the W.I.S.E. The voice from the phone, dubbed Nemesis Q, assigns missions which people must complete if they wish to return home.

While in Psyren for the first time, newcomers are informed of the rules, which basically state that if you tell anyone about Psyren you die; when the number on your card hits zero you beat the game and can't come back; never lose your card, you can't go home if you do; and don't go near the towers. The Psyren Drifters (as they come to be called) breathe in the polluted air from this world of Psyren and it alters their brains, allowing them to surpass human limits and use all their brain cells, at the cost of serious damage. This lets them use a power called PSI, which usually lies dormant, and is usually never awakened. PSI consists of three categories, Enhance (use of PSI to enhance their physical abilities), Blast (external usage of PSI to create power blasts or creatures), and Trance (the ability to affect someone's mental state).

Ageha and his companions meet a group of kids who are adopted by Elmore Tenju, the old lady who placed the 500 million prize offer, as the game progresses. Each child has the ability to use PSI, and Tenju has trained them to one day fight W.I.S.E as the hope of the world. Each child has their own distinct and unique abilities and traumatic background. Ageha stays with them for a while and his abilities really start to grow with the help of techniques developed by the children. They train until he gets called back through his phone and goes back to fight in the game.

The game continues until eventually, Ageha, Sakurako, Hiryū Asaga, Oboro Mochizuki, and Kabuto Kirisaki are the only contenders left. They are trained by former Psyren contestant Matsuri Yagumo and the psychic children from the Tenju Roots Orphanage. Miroku Amagi, a psychic from their timeline, and his organization called W.I.S.E. are revealed to be the cause of Japan's destruction. Their actions slowly change the world of Psyren, resulting in the Tenju Root's survival in the Psyren timeline.

In the Psyren timeline, Mithra, a psychic from W.I.S.E, is revealed to have been manipulating Miroku the whole time. She reveals that a meteorite called Promised Tear turned her into a host for Ouroboros, a planet-eating meteor, and she calls the meteor to Earth. Before the Earth is destroyed, Nemesis Q's controller, No.7, transports them back to their own timeline. Ageha and friends intercept the W.I.S.E group before they gain possession of the Promised Tear. Ageha gives Miroku a card from No.7 allowing him to witness events that occur in the future. Together, Ageha and Miroku are able to defeat Mithra, but Ageha falls into a coma. No.7 contacts Ageha while he is in the coma, revealing the outcome of the Psyren timeline—Miroku and Grana sacrificed their lives to destroy Ouroboros and Mithra. As Ageha wakes up from his coma, he travels with Sakurako and frees No.7 from her cell.

Characters

The Resistance

Ageha is a brash high-schooler who offers to take care of anyone's problems for the price of 10,000 yen ($100). Yoshina and Amamiya were childhood friends, but they grew apart. When they finally talk again in high school, Amamiya runs away but inadvertently asks Yoshina to save her. Later, Yoshina receives a calling card and becomes a participant in the game, Psyren. Upon arriving in the future, he immediately gets attacked by a Taboo but gets saved by Amamiya. Amamiya, after hearing Yoshina came to save her, hugs the confused Yoshina.
After completing the first round, Yoshina trains under Amamiya and Matsuri to improve his PSI abilities. He makes some progress, and they get called into the next round of Psyren. Yoshina's power manifests as a massive black sphere that reacts to PSI. This power is known as "Melzez Door", an ability that creates a concentrated ball of pure Blast energy. It seeks out any PSI energy in the area and completely absorbs it, and it also eradicates any physical matter it touches. Yoshina realizes that if he is not able to control this power, he may end up hurting his friends. After seeing the kids at the Elmore Tenjuin mansion, he figures out how to control his PSI. Yoshina slowly gets used to his power and is constantly thinking of ways to get stronger. As a result, Yoshina has refined his power to the point where it can be used offensively and defensively. Yoshina begins training in the fourth ability of PSI, "Nova", which combines all three PSI abilities of "Enhance", "Blast", and "Trance" in order to surpass the usual limits and achieve a great power boost than other PSI users.
Although hot-blooded, Yoshina has proven himself to be very capable. He understands his lack of power and strives to become strong to protect his friends, especially Amamiya. In chapter 126, while training with Amamiya to learn "Nova", Yoshina confessed his romantic feelings for Amamiya.
Yoshina's main offensive technique is "Melzez Lance". Yoshina creates a condensed sphere and releases it, relying on the indiscriminate targeting of "Melzez Door". Because the sphere is small, it gains enormous speed, but it is less powerful, and thus less taxing on Yoshina's mind. His second technique, he keeps "Melzez Door" in one place by rotating it, which creates a flat disk used like a shield in order to block, and also for close-range offensive attacks. His third technique, "Melzez Vortex", can be used both offensively and defensively. Yoshina creates condensed spheres linked together in a line, allowing for greater control. In the defensive mode, "Melzez Vortex" forms a semi-sphere around him and absorbs PSI attacks. In the attack mode, Yoshina breaks the links and releases the spheres, causing them to target PSI sources. (Voiced by): Takahiro Sakurai in the VOMIC.

Childhood friend of Yoshina Ageha, she comforted him when his mom died. During the first day of high school, Amamiya coldly told everyone to leave her alone until graduation. As a result, "Ice Queen" has no friends and is the victim of constant bullying. When Yoshina returns her stolen wallet, Amamiya hurries away but asks, under her breath, for him to come save her. Amamiya has been back and forth to Psyren a couple of times before the start of the series.
Amamiya is proficient in Trance, using illusions to deceive her opponents, reading their minds, forcefully extracting information from their memories, and manipulating their perceptions of reality. She is also proficient in Enhance, physically defeating her opponents after mindjacking them via Trance, and she uses various samurai swords, scythes, tonfas, and other traditional Japanese and Chinese weaponry that she brings to Psyren. Because she was usually the only one to return from Psyren, she blamed herself for everyone who died. In order to cope with this, Amamiya developed a split personality. Any emotions that she cannot handle, including her feelings for Yoshina, are locked away in an alternate personality known as "Abyss" that resides deep within her. When Amamiya was heavily wounded, Abyss took over. Abyss refers to herself as "the beautiful, cool me" while Amamiya is "the cute, kind me". Abyss, identified by her darker skin, has homicidal tendencies but resists them because Yoshina would hate her if she killed anyone. Amamiya excels at Trance while Abyss excels at Blast.
Amamiya is innocent when it comes to love. She could not handle her feelings for Yoshina and locked them away in her split personality. When Abyss surfaced and proclaimed her love to Yoshina, Amamiya once again becomes aware of her feelings. When Amamiya confronts Yoshina about what Abyss said, they almost kiss, but are interrupted by the kids.
Amamiya is strong, but she realizes that she causes trouble for Yoshina. In order to stay by his side forever, Amamiya wants to become stronger. When she overhears Yoshina's conversation with his dad about "Nova", Amamiya decides she wants to learn it as well. She has trouble learning until Yoshina holds her hand and tells her they'll learn it together. After hearing Yoshina confess his long-time feelings for her, she breaks down and the two embrace. During the Resistance's liberation of Astral Nova, Amamiya uses her newly gained Nova ability, which divides her into two beings—herself and Abyss—while fighting Shiner (the 4th Star Commander), and kills him quickly.
Amamiya has shown two techniques. One is "Wired Mind Jack", where she sends a wired Trance into her enemy's mind and attempts to extract information. Her second technique is "Mind Jack: Insanity Scythe". Amamiya creates a giant crystallization of her Trance in the shape of a scythe. When shattered, it releases quantum thought waves that cause the enemy to hallucinate. Her Nova ability allows her to split into two beings, her original self and Abyss. This ability allows Amamiya and Abyss to work together as a team; Amamiya reads her opponent's mind using Trance and relays information to Abyss via telepathy, allowing the latter to perform actions immediately. (Voiced by):Yui Horie in the VOMIC.

Asaga is a tough guy who says that he came to Psyren in search of his friend, Tatsuo. He agrees to help Amamiya for Yoshina. After their safe return to earth, he comforts Yoshina about Amamiya being taken by an unknown friend, and reveals himself to be Asaga Hiryū, Ageha's former classmate from elementary school who used to be a crybaby. He displays more proficiency with PSI than Ageha, quickly learning how to use and control his abilities. Asaga's PSI ability resembles the tail of a Dragon in its Blast state, fitting his nickname, Dragon; he chose it as a heroic monicker, hoping to become worthy of it for Tatsuo's sake. Advances in his PSI ability allow him to create the wings of a Dragon that can whip up huge gales. Matsuri warns him to keep an eye on Ageha and Oboro's abilities; He claims Asaga is the only one who could take them out if necessary. He has decided to stay in Psyren to help build resistance against WISE. He appeared alongside Tatsuo and Kusakabe to aid in the defense of Tenju's Root. Eventually he is able to manifest a complete dragon using his PSI.

An idol in the present, Oboro received a calling card and tried to tell the nation about it on a local talk show, but was silenced by Nemesis Q. He develops PSI powers that allows him to heal his comrades. He joins Matsuri's training session, completing it without any problems. He demonstrates an ability to kill a Taboo by 'dissolving' it when he touches it. He is the fastest when using Enhance. He has taken a liking to Ageha, stating that if Ageha got hurt, he would "hug him any time". Oboro later reappears during the initial battle at WISE's main base, having survived his fatal wound by using Cure to assimilate numerous Taboo illumina cores; as a result, he gained a new ability called 'Harmonious', which allows him to manipulate and assimulate life. In Kabuto's words, Oboro is absolutely nuts (and someone he doesn't want to trust his life too), not to mention how weird he is found by his comrades. He later resumes his career upon returning from the final battle in Psyren, spared from disintegration since the Illumina cores were disabled by No.7.

A local playboy, Kabuto's former way of life was running away from problems and annoyances as a way to achieve peace. He is also greedy, owing his uncle several thousand Yen. After a talk with his uncle, he decides to change. Kabuto goes to Psyren to try to make his fortune, and is among the new arrivals during the group's second trip to Psyren. Kabuto's PSI is a type of precognition known as "Menace", an ability to predict danger that allows him to avoid enemy attacks. He later creates an avatar on the same level as Nemesis Q, naming it YoYo. It allows him to dodge attacks and deflect them back at the enemy with incredible force. YoYo cannot be seen, so many mistake Kabuto for a telekenesis user.

W.I.S.E.

Miroku is a mysterious man who appears in the present disguised as Inui's brother who had died years ago. Miroku hypnotizes Inui, and has him steal money to advance his plans to create a new world with his organization called W.I.S.E. Miroku's psychic ability is called Sephirot, which allows him to create trees made of light for offensive and defensive purposes. One of his signature abilities is an attack called "Gevurah", which allows Miroku to create a tree of light which pierces everything. The attack is extremely powerful, as it allowed Miroku to finish all of the Elmore Wood children in one blow. This incident is seen in the original videotape that the drifters find in Psyren. It has been implied that he may have been behind the arrival of the meteor Uroboros that destroyed and transformed the earth. He is responsible for hunting survivors and turning them into Taboo. He is the younger twin brother of the Creator of Nemesis Q. He is one of the Grigori's experimental subject and was known as #06. During the Resistance's liberation of Astral Nova, Miroku creates a gigantic tree of light. He is confronted by Ageha. The two battle, and Ageha overpowers Miroku using his newly developed Nova ability, dealing a critical blow on the W.I.S.E. leader's body. Though wounded, Miroku states that his ultimate plan had finally come to fruition, as the tree he just created is beginning to destroy the surrounding environment. The tree is spawning strange growths that look like embryos. Miroku reveals that this is the effect of Sephirot's final ability, "Keter", which will destroy all life on Earth and replace it with the new life form that the tree creates. Mithra shows herself and sabotages Miroku's plan, revealing that she was manipulating Miroku all along to suit her own agenda. She reveals that she serves under a planet-eating entity called Quat Nevas, and that Miroku's plan has created enough energy for her master to devour Earth.
 (Star Commander No. 1)
The leader of the Star Commanders, he is lazy and forgetful. He has an eye-patch over his right eye. His PSI ability is telekinesis; he uses it to create a massive building from thousands of pieces in a matter of minutes. Grana has also demonstrated an ability called 'Sun Fall': he uses telekinesis to bend light photons and create a massive beam capable of disintegrating most matter instantly. He orders Shiner and Dholaki to retrieve Ageha and bring him back to the WISE headquarters. Grana, known as Grigori #01 was the original 'prototype', a type of experimental subject who was brought up from fetus, created through Grigori's Gene manipulation. It is revealed that he was the one responsible for killing Matsuri and Kagetora in the future.
 (Star Commander No. 2)
 The second member of W.I.S.E. introduced, he has the appearance of a young teenager. He wears a distinctive black helmet with a fin on the crest. He appears to be a swordsman, and has the ability to materialize swords. He appears with Dholaki and Miroku in his declaration of war in the second version of the future, and it is assumed he was there in the unchanged future. He takes a job has a janitor in a disbanded orphanage in order to look for Caprico, to convince her to join WISE. He is one of the Grigori and was known as #05. His PSI ability is called "Bishamon-Mura". It takes the form of hundreds of fragile swords that float in the air. When they break the pieces drop down and cut the enemy to pieces. He also has shown an ability called "Bishamon-Tsubute". By using a knife medium, he stabs or slashes towards an enemy. He leads the assault on Tenju's Root, and would have killed Ageha if not for the timely intervention of Asuka, who injures him using the newly discovered PSI ability known as Nova.
 (Star Commander No. 3)
Also known as 'Grigori 03', he is a psychicer with a youthful appearance. He, like Grana and Miroku, is a product of the Grigori research facility. With his PSI ability "Deep Freeze", Uranus is capable of manipulating ice in whatever way he chooses. He is able to materialize guns made of ice, which shoot bullets that cover the target with thick ice. He is able to create ice skate blades on the bottom of his shoes to accommodate for the change in the environment that his attacks create. Uranus made his first appearance when he and Eiji Kise are recruited into W.I.S.E. shortly after Grana joins the group in the present timeline. Uranus once worked for the government as an assassin, and tracked Grana after he escaped from the Grigori. After being defeated by Grana, Uranus severed his ties with the government. Uranus make his second appearance in the current version of the future, criticizing Junas' failure to invade Tenju's Roots and losing half of the Scourge unit. He is now W.I.S.E.'s Star Commander No. 3, a position which belonged to Shiner (now Star Commander No. 4) in the previous version of the future. He was killed in battle by Kyle and Frederica during the Resistance's attempt to liberate Astral Nova.

 (Star Commander No. 4; demoted from 3rd after he was almost killed by Shao and Frederica)
The third member of W.I.S.E. introduced, he arrives after Dholaki is defeated by Ageha. His outward appearance is calm and gentle. He is very curious. He is the head of W.I.S.E.'s PSI Research Division. He takes a special interest in Ageha and his ability. Shiner's PSI ability, dubbed the "Hexagonal Transfer System", allows him to teleport himself or other people, making it easy for him to kill his opponents. In chapter 66 he was defeated after being outdone by Shao's power. His arm was broken by Amamiya, and he was almost killed by Frederica. After returning to his tower, he kills a Taboo, not wanting anyone to see him in such a "disgraceful manner". He wonders if the reason he escaped to the tower was because of fear. Shiner is now W.I.S.E.'s Star Commander No. 4 in the current version of the future (the No. 3 position belongs to Uranus). During the Resistance's liberation of Astral Nova, Shiner is killed by Amamiya, who uses her new Nova ability against him.

 (Star Commander No. 5, Former)
The first member of W.I.S.E introduced, he has long silvery hair and a wears a long coat with a large collar. His upper face is covered with a bird-like visor similar to that of Nemesis Q. He is the head of W.I.S.E.'s Border Security Division. Dholki is very proud, so after being defeated by Ageha's "Melchsee's Door", he implanted a second core into himself. This gives him more power, but he only has a .5% chance of surviving a year. He is seen in Tatsuo's flashback as the man who oversaw the implanting of the core in Tatsuo's chest. Matsuri briefly met him in the tower during her time in Psyren, and was attacked before narrowly escaping. During Ageha's third trip to Psyren, Dholaki is alerted to the drifters' presence and offers to confront them on his own. Dholki does battle with Ageha and his upgraded "Melchsee's Door", but is defeated. Dholki possesses a PSI ability called "Explosia" that creates massive explosions using Burst, which also allows him to deviate PSI waves. He appears along with Junas and Miroku in his declaration of war in the second version of the future, and it is assumed he was there in the unchanged future. He came back to take revenge on Yoshina. He quickly shows that his upgraded Explosia is more than a match for Ageha's Melchsee's Door, but he is killed by Kyle when both his cores are destroyed.
 (Vigo) (Star Commander No. 5)
A demented serial killer with long limbs and lanky stature, he was recruited into W.I.S.E. along with Grigori #03 shortly after Grana joins the group in the present timeline. Kise considers his killings an art form, and views himself as a genius in performing such acts. He joined Miroku to learn greater powers for his art. His PSI ability, "Zone Diver", grants him the ability to phase himself through solid objects such as walls, allowing him to stealthily kill his victims using his two knives. Kise is capable of assimilating his body into the surrounding environment. This allows him to create a countless number of limbs or move his vitals anywhere within the environment. He can drag his victims into the environment, which either traps them or turns them into a statue by encasing them with materials from the environment. In the future timeline, Kise (now referred as Vigo) joins Junas and the Star Commander's elite Scourge unit to invade Tenju's Roots. During the invasion, Vigo develops an interest on Marie and threatened to turn her into one of his collections, but was stopped in time by Shao. The two engage in a brutal battle, with Shao emerging as the victor, breaking Vigo's neck. Vigo survives Shao's killing blow and knocks Marie unconscious and kidnaps her. As Vigo leaves Tenju's Roots with the unconscious Marie, he chillingly tells a helpless Van to send a message to Shao, informing him that if he wishes to rescue Marie, he will have to travel to W.I.S.E.'s capital at Astral Nova, and face him there. He is killed by Mithra while trying to save Marie.
 (Star Commander No. 6, 4 in previous timeline))
The fourth member of W.I.S.E. introduced, she has the appearance of a cute teenage girl with a distinctive star-shaped scar on her forehead. She appears to be the head of W.I.S.E.'s Biological Research Division. It's suggested some of the wild Taboo are her creations; most are mutations from Illumina cores. Back in the present world, she is a girl from a disbanded orphanage who gained her abilities after falling from a cliff. She is called the "creator" by Miroku. She has the ability to bring to life anything that she draws. When Junas recruits her in the present, she instantly becomes attached to him, seeing him as her first true friend as he lets her draw to her heart's content; she was forbidden by others due to her powers. By the Psyren timeline, her attachment to Junas has grown into a deep love; because of this, Kagetora spare his life.

A mysterious figure with the appearance of a young woman, not much is known about Misura other than that she is a member of W.I.S.E.'s Council of Elders. She is not a human nor from the earth. When Misura's body begins to crack, it looks similar to the alien life form within the Ouroboros Meteor that hit the Earth in December of 2009. Misura develops an interest in Marie, who was captured and brought to Astral Nova by Vigo. Misura wants to take Marie as its next host. Misura seems to be able to track the lives of other PSI users using her PSI ability called "Bonfire", evidenced when she telepathically informs Miroku of Yusaka's death shortly after it happened. She possesses some kind of precognitive ability similar to those of Kabuto and Elmore Tenjuin, as she is confident that Yusaka would eventually betray W.I.S.E. Small flames resembling a will-o'-wisp can be seen when Misura uses her telepathy to communicate with Miroku. She refers to people with the name of their PSI power rather than their actual names.

A W.I.S.E. member introduced in the present, he is a dark-skinned man with a slender build. Although he appears to be a trusted friend of Kouichi Iba, Yusaka is a spy sent by Miroku Amagi to keep an eye on Kouichi Iba and ensure that he doesn't betray Miroku. Initially Yusaka seems to be a friendly person, but he is actually a violent psychopath that enjoys killing. His PSI ability is called "Candyman". This ability allows Yusaka to create various kinds of insects which create poisonous gas when he injects himself with different kinds of poison. "Candyman" also allows Yusaka to infect his victims with a poisonous virus when he touches them. Yusaka is the one responsible for infecting Matsuri with a virus in the unchanged version of the future, which eventually led to her and Kagetora's demise at the hands of Grana and Shiner. Yusaka was confronted by Yoshina and Amamiya, which led to a violent battle. He was defeated by Yoshina, who uses his newly developed Melzez Vortex to mortally wound Yusaka. Before he died he used nitroglycerin to blow up the laboratory.

The main force behind the events in the series, as well as Mithra's true master, Quat Nevas is a planet-eating entity which existed long before humans were born. It waited patiently during the Psyren timeline, for when Miroku would produce enough energy for it to eat earth.

Tenju's Root

Elmore Tenjuin is an old woman, a clairvoyant Psychicer in current-day Japan who is trying to unlock the secrets of Psyren to save Japan from its intended future. She is offering 500 million yen to whoever can figure out Psyren. With her ability to see into the future, called Millennium Kaleidoscope, she has seen what Japan will eventually become. Her husband, Koper, was a Psyren drifter who could read minds. Together, they became wealthy and famous for their fortune-telling ability. After retiring, the couple began taking in gifted orphan children and helping them train their PSI abilities. One year ago, Koper turned into ash when he attempted to tell her about Psyren. Before he died, Elmore looked into Koper's mind and saw Psyren's calling card, Nemesis Q, the future of the world. Tenjuin Elmore trains PSI-training orphans in her home, known as Elmore Wood. She was destined to die in a plane crash, but Ageha delayed her trip to the airport and saved her life. In the future, she is leading the group known as "Tenju's Root". During the attack on Tenju's Root by members of WISE, she was injured trying to prevent Mari's kidnapping. Despite Van's healing abilities, he deems her "uncurable" and she soon dies of old age.

A cute blonde spoiled girl with pyrokinesis, Frederica has fire-based powers and a temper to match. She dislikes outsiders and is loud-mouthed and inconsiderate. She refers to herself as a spy codenamed "Ravishing Rose". She unknowingly lost control of her powers and burnt down her house when she fell ill. She disliked Ageha in the past, but she cooperates to teach him 'Blast Stream'. Although her personality has not changed much in the future, Frederica displays tsundere-like behavior. Frederica often tries to make people her servant. She eventually warms up to people a little more, including Kabuto, with whom she had the most difficulty. She is starting to have a crush on Ageha, and she deeply cares about Marie, but is too shy to say so. As a child, she dubbed her ability "Pyro Queen." In the second future, she develops a program called "Salamandra" for her Pyro Queen. During the Resistance's attempt to liberate Astral Nova, she was critically injured by Grana.

A girl who uses telekinesis. She is the complete opposite of her friend Frederica, being shy and very kind. In the future, Marie is revealed to have developed a crush on Ageha during his time at Elmore Wood to train. Her telekinetic abilities are highly developed; she is able to rip apart an environment and avoid harming important people or friends. Thanks to a janken game, Marie is the leader of Tenju's Root. She was kidnapped by the WISE in their assault on Tenju's Root.

A mischievous, but powerful boy, Kyle is quite handsome though he has a scar on his face caused by Miroku. He has a good build. He and Ageha have established a brotherly relationship and he is quite clingy as he wants Ageha to stay around to play in the present. His ability, called "Material High" is Blast-based. It lets him create nearly invisible solid material by super-compressing the air. He says in his fight with Dholaki that his main power lies in Enhance. In the future, Kyle develops his Enhance abilities, which give him superhuman speed and strength.

Shao is a calm, rational Chinese boy. He specializes in tracking people down. His past is similar to Frederica's. His power, dubbed "Shinra-Banshou" or "All Creation", enables him to sense and redirect the PSI energy around him. It also allows him to sense other PSI users, as well as seeing the "true nature" of people. He describes Amamiya as "seven finely sharpened blades", Oboro as "white sea", and Ageha as "starry sky". In the future, Shao develops the ability to nullify other people's PSI powers through their mind. Shao has a crush on Marie.

Van is a quiet and apathetic boy who possesses the ability to heal people. He likes to eat a lot of sweets. He is kind and generous, as seen when he gives his plate to Frederica to lick when she can't have any desserts. In the future, his personality changes into a talkative and emotional teenager, often spilling secrets such as Marie and Shao's respective crushes. It is later revealed that the reason behind his personality change is because he was the only one left with healing powers after Ian died. His healing abilities progress to the point he is able to regenerate peoples' limbs when they are within his Cure Zone. He speaks French.

A Psychicer chosen by Kyotada Inui for his unique ability to transport items with his PSI ability, called "Trick Room". He creates two boxes that are linked by an alternate dimension, then places one box over the specific coordinates of an item and "downloads" the contents into the other box, making a completely untraceable robbery. Lan agrees to help Inui because he needs money to pay for his comatose sister's hospital stay. He is alive in the future, and is a part of "Tenju's Root". He helps transport Marie, Kyle, Van, Kabuto, and Ageha to the hideout using his Trick Room.

Haruhiko is a Psychicer with the ability, called "Shocker", to manipulate electricity. Haruhiko was chosen by Kyotada for his current operations of stealing money from the underworld. In the future, he joins "Tenju's Root", and is responsible for supplying most of the base's energy with his Shocker ability. He is defender of Tenju's Root, fending off potential attackers with his enhanced Shocker abilities. He refers to himself as the Root's protector "deity." He powers came in handy when the team hacked into one of the towers in Psyren.

Chicka is the comatose sister of Lan Shinonome; she is the reason her older brother agreed to aid Inui in his illicit activities, in order to obtain money for her medical treatment. In the future, she has recovered from her coma, and is among the members of "Tenju's Root". She is healed by Ian after receiving a request from his rival. It is assumed that she, like her brother, is a Psychicer, though her abilities have yet to be demonstrated. She can drive a motorcycle, like Matsuri.

Other characters

Nemesis is a PSI program with basic intelligence and individuality sent back from the future to select people worthy of using PSI to teach them about the future, discover the truth, and stop Psyren from occurring. The creator of "Q" mentioned that her body could not withstand the time-travel transfer so she sent a program to do her work. Its creator embedded another order in Q: to kill those who divulge information about Psyren. Nemesis Q's creator is Miroku Amagi's older twin sister, a psychicher girl that was taken, along with her brother, by the government at the age of six. When Q transports someone into the future, events in the interval occur as if the person involved simply disappeared. Q gives special treatments to Ageha, because she thinks Ageha's powers are significant.

A famous concert pianist and veteran Psyren drifter, Matsuri taught Amamiya about Psyren. Because her card's value is already at zero, she cannot help the main characters, and acts in a mentor role. She is a talented pianist, drinks a lot, and drives a motorcycle. When Ageha and Asaga first met her, she was drunk and responding to a call for assistance from Amamiya. She reacts playfully in regards to Ian and Kagetora's crush on her. She is concerned about Ageha and Oboro's abilities, and tells Hiryu that he is the only one who could take them down if necessary. Matsuri is an extremely competent user of Blast: using her vast telekinetic abilities, she trains Ageha in controlling his highly destructive Blast abilities. She deflected his full "Melzez Door" a number of times, while showing no visible strain. In the future she is suspected to be dead, along with Kagetora. Her true level of power was revealed by Grana, supposedly the strongest member of the WISE; he stated that she was "more like an Almighty Type". He remarks that, had she been in a better condition, she might have "stood a chance" against him. When she later appears in Psyren, having been given a chance to return by Nemesis Q, her PSI manifests as multiple spheres of energy – when her spheres make contact with something, they explode with great force. Grana stated that while Matsuri's strength and speed were below his, they were made equal by Matsuri's impressive sense of battle, and an ability she had that Grana described as "a rhythm that pulls her opponent into her own pace". He commented that her "emotions were like a wave".

Kagetora is friend of Matsuri who is an expert user of Enhance-type PSI, claiming to be the best Enhance user in all of eastern Japan. Kagetora says that he is always available to die or kill for Matsuri ever since she saved him; he has proposed to Matsuri 22 times and was turned down every time. His physical appearance is that of a gangster, with sunglasses, slicked-back hair, and a print button-down shirt. His favorite food is Mont Blanc cake, he loves cats, and he would never harm a woman or child. Kagetora is a Psychicer, and does not know any of the details of Psyren. He comes to help Matsuri train the new Psyren Drifters in Enhance techniques. While trying to stop a group of PSI users that were using their power to commit crimes, he was nearly killed by Inui, but was saved by Ageha. In the future, he is suspected to be dead, along with Matsuri. The Kagetora of the past appears in Psyren alongside Matsuri to save Agehea and Amamiya from Grana and Junas, having been given a chance to do so by Nemesis Q. His PSI allows him to regenerate from damage at an extremely accelerated rate.

Tatsuo is a friend of Asaga's who is sick with a hereditary disease. He grew angry with the outside world so he went to Psyren and offered Asaga a card, but he refused. In Psyren, a masked figure that strongly resembles Tatsuo appears, holding a rifle that uses PSI energy: he kills all but five survivors, takes his aim at them, and destroys part of a building. He is a Blast user, and he also uses Enhance; however, after using Trance, Amamiya realizes that Tatsuo was transformed into a Taboo by having an orb implanted. Tatsuo regains his mind after being hit by Ageha; however, his core remains because it is integrated to his body. Because he does not have his card, he stays in Psyren. He will die when his core runs out of energy, but will look for a way around this. He describes his time as a Taboo as being trapped in someone else's body and regrets all the killing he did. He appears in chapter 69, when he saves Asaga from some Taboo. He is later shown with a new Asaga, as they are planning to take down a tower. Tatsuo appears during the WISE attack on Tenju's Root, riding atop Hiryu's dragon PSI: he uses his gun to poke holes in the dark sky, revealing the sun and causing the Taboo in the area to disintegrate.

Ian is a superior cure user and old friend of Matsuri with a rather unfriendly personality: he doesn't want others to know about his power, because he wants to live his life in peace. Ian has proposed to Matsuri 12 times and has been refused every time, but has not given up. He is a born PSI user and thus cannot be told anything related to Psyren. He is willing to wait until Matsuri can tell him, and promised not stick his nose in it. After Matsuri and Kagetora die in the old future, he becomes extremely upset. He dies while over-using his powers to save 30 people who should have died from their wounds; after the loss of their savior, Van steps in as healer. He was married to Fubuki Yoshina in the new future and had a son named Marco, but all three were captured by W.I.S.E.—along with many other civilians—during the invasion of Tenju's Roots. His son breaks the seal on the prison, releasing all the captives; at the same moment, reinforcements sent to release them arrived. He trained Van in the new future in cure and he helped train Kabuto in the new past.

Fubuki is the older sister and guardian of Ageha Yoshina. She lectures him, hits him for little things like being late, and goes as far as tying him up from the ceiling repeatedly. She has a crush on the idol Oboro Mochizuki. In the new future, she is married to Ian and had a baby son named Marco, but all three were captured by W.I.S.E. during the invasion of Tenju's Roots.

Asuka is the father of both Ageha and Fubuki; although 47 years old, he doesn't look that much older than his children. He is an astronomer, and, before his wife's death, was very much an absent father; after his wife died, he tried his best to become the father he felt his children deserved. He is normally calm, but is quick to discipline Ageha, with violence if necessary; he is physically strong, apparently from learning karate online. Rather than trying to find out what Ageha is doing every time he goes missing, Asuka decides to disown his son; in the future, Asuka returns to aid Ageha in the defense of Tenju's Root: he battles Star Commander Junas using his newly developed PSI power – the ability to control gravity. He demonstrates the ability to expand his power's range alongside a literal sphere of influence: within it, he can control gravity completely, drastically weakening his opponent's PSI powers; he curves the time-space continuum around the sphere, thus slowing the progress of time for those within. Ageha comments that perhaps this power was always active within his father, as it would help explain his youthful looks: he is capable of using PSI's hidden potential, known as "Nova", to enhance his powers; however, he cannot maintain this enhanced state for very long, as it puts great strain on his brain.

A strange man met in the world of Psyren, Kusakabe is an acquaintance of Tatsuo and has an inhuman appearance; they have been working together on a plan to take down the WISE, which involves making the membrane covering the sky of Psyren weaker in specific areas: this would allow an attack to rip through the membrane and cause the sun to shine through. Since the sun is toxic to anyone with an Illumina core, if they could split the membrane above Tokyo, they would be able to disperse and potentially kill the forces of WISE. He was previously employed by WISE and he hacked into their Neural Control Programme using his PSI-power – the ability to communicate with technology as if it were sentient.

Media

Manga

Psyren, written and illustrated by Toshiaki Iwashiro, was serialized in Shueisha's shōnen manga magazine Weekly Shōnen Jump from December 3, 2007, to November 29, 2010. Shueisha collected its 161 chapters in 16 tankōbon volumes released from May 2, 2008, to March 4, 2011.

In North America, Viz Media announced the license to the manga in April 2010, and the first chapter appeared in the January 2011 issue of the North American version of Shonen Jump.

Light novel
A light novel written by SOW, titled Psyren: Another Call, was released on September 3, 2010. It includes various short stories about the characters. A second volume was released on March 4, 2011. It focuses on different epilogue stories that detailed the futures and lives of the characters.

Reception
Volumes from Psyren have commonly appeared in Japan's best-selling lists of manga volumes.

References

External links
 Official listing at Shueisha 
 

2007 manga
Adventure anime and manga
Science fiction anime and manga
Shueisha manga
Shōnen manga
Viz Media manga